Stanya may refer to:

 Stanya Kahn (born 1968), American video artist
 Stanya, Astrakhan Oblast, Russia
 Stanya, an Icelandic band led by Þorsteinn Magnússon after leaving Þeyr